Tada is a Japanese surname. It has also been used as a given name. Notable people with the name include:

Surname
 Akifumi Tada (born 1964), Japanese anime music composer and video game composer
 Aoi Tada (born 1981), Japanese singer and voice actress
 Asami Tada (born 1988), Japanese gravure idol
 Chimako Tada (1930–2003), Japanese poet
 Daisuke Tada (born 1982), Japanese football goalkeeper
 Etsuko Tada (born 1989), Japanese professional boxer
 Hayao Tada (1882–1948), general in the Imperial Japanese Army in the Second Sino-Japanese War
 Hiroshi Tada (born 1929), Japanese aikido teacher
 Hiroshi Tada (performer), performer of a Japanese style of top spinning known as koma-mawashi
 Joni Eareckson Tada (born 1949) American, author, radio host, and evangelical Christian
 Kaoru Tada (1960–1999), Japanese manga artist
 Kageyoshi Tada (died 1950), Japanese physician
 Kenzo Tada (1889–a. 1930), Japanese dirt track motorcycle racer
 Tada Kasuke (died 1687), Japanese farmer and rebel
 Tada Mitsuyori (1501–1563), Japanese samurai of the Sengoku period
, Japanese alpine skier
 Ryosuke Tada (born 1992), Japanese football defender
 Seigo Tada (1922–1997), founder of Goju-Ryu Seigokan Karatedo
 Takayuki Tada (born 1988), Japanese football midfielder

Given name
 Tada Keelalay (born 1984), Thai football defender

Japanese-language surnames